Ploskoye is a rural locality (a selo) and the administrative center of Ploskovskoye Rural Settlement, Korochansky District, Belgorod Oblast, Russia. The population was 247 as of 2010. There are 3 streets.

Geography 
Ploskoye is located 20 km southwest of Korocha (the district's administrative centre) by road. Peschanoye is the nearest rural locality.

References 

Rural localities in Korochansky District